Casearia flexula is a species of flowering plant in the family Salicaceae. It is endemic to Peninsular Malaysia. It is threatened by habitat loss.

References

flexula
Endemic flora of Peninsular Malaysia
Data deficient plants
Taxonomy articles created by Polbot